Ntsetsao Viola Motsumi is a South African politician. In May 2019, she was elected deputy speaker of the North West Provincial Legislature and consequently became the youngest deputy speaker in South Africa. In November 2022, she was appointed as the Member of the Executive Council for Education in the North West province. Motsumi is a member of the African National Congress.

Early life and education
Motsumi was born in the village Madibe-Makgabane. She matriculated from Mmabatho High School in 2001 and went on to study at North-West University. From the university, she holds a B.Sc. degree in physics, a postgraduate certificate in education, and a BScHons degree in microbiology. She obtained an MBA from the university in 2019. Motsumi worked as a teacher at Mmabatho High between 2008 and 2015.

Political career
In May 2019, she was elected to the North West Provincial Legislature as an African National Congress representative. She was sworn in as an MPL on 22 May. On the same day, she was elected deputy speaker, succeeding Jane Manganye. At the time, Motsumi was the youngest deputy speaker in South Africa.

On 22 November 2022, premier Bushy Maape conducted a reshuffle of his executive council which saw Motsumi being appointed as Member of the Executive Council for Education. She resigned as deputy speaker on 7 December 2022 and became the Education MEC, succeeding Wendy Matsemela, who resigned from the legislature.

References

External links
Ntsetsao Viola Motsumi – People's Assembly

Living people
Year of birth missing (living people)
Women members of provincial legislatures of South Africa
Women legislative speakers
South African women in politics
People from North West (South African province)
Members of the North West Provincial Legislature
Chairs of subnational legislatures
South African politicians